Omar Linares Izquierdo (born October 23, 1968) is a former Cuban baseball player. He was born in San Juan y Martínez, Pinar del Río Province, Cuba. Linares played third base for the Cuba national baseball team and for Pinar del Río and Vegueros in the Cuban National Series wearing the number 10 on his jersey. After a career as a player in Cuba, Linares, along with other Cuba baseball players such as Antonio Pacheco, Orestes Kindelan, and German Mesa, in coordination with the Cuba national baseball commission, decided to try the Nippon Professional Baseball. Linares spent three seasons with the Chunichi Dragons, wearing the number 44 on his jersey, before returning to Cuba. In 2009 Linares decided to become a batting coach and first base coach for longtime rival team Industriales, helping them to conquer a national championship (his first as an assistant coach). Although Linares never received an official retiring ceremony, the season of 2001–2002 is considered to be his last appearance in Cuba National Baseball Series.

Career in Cuba
Linares spent 20 seasons with Pinar del Río in Cuba's National Series, compiling a career .368 batting average, the best in the league's history, with 404 home runs (third among all-times in Cuban league), 1,547 runs batted in and 264 stolen bases. He led the National Series in batting average four times, in RBIs four times and in walks six times. At the end of his career, Linares spent three seasons with the Chunichi Dragons of Japan's Central League. He retired in 2004.

International career
As a 14-year-old, Linares was the starting second baseman for the Cuba National youth team at the World Championship, where they won gold. His debut in Cuba national baseball series at the age of 14 was marked by his father's decision of not allowing him to play with Forestales (second team of Pinar del Río) on road games, therefore Linares only played home games that year. The inclusion of Linares in the Cuba national baseball team at the age of 17, as an optional replacement of slugger Jose "Cheito" Rodriguez after the suspension of "Cheito" by the Cuba National baseball commission, is attributed to former manager Jose Miguel Pineda. Linares was a mainstay on the national team under the guidance of Luis Giraldo Casanova during much of the 1980s and 1990s, as the starting third baseman on World Championship winning teams in 1986, 1988, 1990, 1994, 1998 and 2001. He was part of Cuba's Olympic gold medal teams in 1992 and 1996, and the silver medal team in 2000. Linares also played for the Cuba national team in the 1999 Baltimore Orioles – Cuba national baseball team exhibition series.

References

 

1968 births
Living people
Olympic baseball players of Cuba
Olympic gold medalists for Cuba
Olympic silver medalists for Cuba
Olympic medalists in baseball
Medalists at the 1992 Summer Olympics
Medalists at the 1996 Summer Olympics
Medalists at the 2000 Summer Olympics
Baseball players at the 1992 Summer Olympics
Baseball players at the 1996 Summer Olympics
Baseball players at the 2000 Summer Olympics
Pan American Games gold medalists for Cuba
Baseball players at the 1991 Pan American Games
Baseball players at the 1995 Pan American Games
Baseball players at the 1999 Pan American Games
Cuban expatriate baseball players in Japan
Chunichi Dragons players
Pan American Games medalists in baseball
Goodwill Games medalists in baseball
Competitors at the 1990 Goodwill Games
Medalists at the 1991 Pan American Games
Medalists at the 1995 Pan American Games
Medalists at the 1999 Pan American Games
People from Pinar del Río Province